.
Giorgio di Giovanni, also known as Giorgio da Siena) (active 1538 and died 1559) was an Italian painter of the Renaissance period, active mainly in Siena.

Biography
Little is known about the life of the painter. His work, for example the frescoes at the Castello di Belcaro, have been also been attributed to Baldassare Peruzzi. Other works such as the Flight of Cloelia have been attributed to Domenico Beccafumi and Marco Bigio. Giorgio di Giovanni is known to have worked circa 1525–1530 on the Vatican Loggie in Rome along with Giovanni da Udine.

References

Date of birth unknown
1559 deaths
16th-century Italian painters
Italian male painters
Painters from Siena
Italian Renaissance painters